Abdullahi Godah Barre is a Somali politician and member of parliament . He is the Minister of Education and Higher Education of Somalia, having been appointed to the position on 17 January 2017 by Prime Minister Hassan Ali Khaire. 
Godah Barre previously served as Minister of Interior and Federalism in Abdiweli Mohamed Ali cabinet period from 2014 until the end of 2016.

References

Living people
Government ministers of Somalia
Year of birth missing (living people)
Place of birth missing (living people)